is a Japanese manga series about wine. It is created and written by Tadashi Agi, a pseudonym employed by creative team of sister and brother Yuko and Shin Kibayashi, with artwork by Shu Okimoto. The story is told in two parts – the first part focusing on protagonist Shizuku Kanzaki and his rival Issei Tomine on their search of the "Twelve Apostles" wines, and the second focusing on finding the "Drops Of God".

The first series was first published in November 2004 in Weekly Morning magazine in Japan and ended in June 2014, with the final volume out in July. The sequel manga, titled  that continued where the original manga left off, focusing on Shizuku traveling abroad to deepen his knowledge of wine and his search for the "Drops of God". The manga's theme is the "marriage" between wine and food, exploring the many different combinations between them. Serialization began on May 28, 2015, a  few months after the original manga ended its serialization, and was completed on October 15, 2020, collected into a total of 26 volumes.
 Currently, Marriage ~The Drops of God Final Arc~ is only released in Japan and has not been licensed for an English release.

Drops of God is widely successful, receiving praise for its accurate knowledge of wines, characters, story, and art, and is famous for its global impact on the wine market, especially the sales of wines profiled in the manga. Drops of God also inspired two live-action TV adaptions.

Plot
Shizuku Kanzaki is a junior employee in a Japanese beverages company, Taiyo ("Sun" in Japanese) Beer mainly focusing on selling beers. As the story opens, he receives news that his father, from whom he is estranged, has died.  His father was the world-renowned wine critic Yutaka Kanzaki, who owned a vast and famous wine collection.  Summoned to the family home, a splendid European style mansion, to hear the reading of his father's will, Shizuku learns that, in order to take ownership of his legacy, he must correctly identify, and describe in the manner of his late father, thirteen wines, the first twelve known as the "Twelve Apostles" and the thirteenth known as the "Drops of God" ("Kami no Shizuku" in the original Japanese edition and "Les Gouttes de Dieu" in the French translation), that his father has described in his will.  He also learns that he has a competitor in this, a renowned young wine critic called Issei Tomine, who his father has apparently recently adopted as his other son.

Shizuku has never drunk wine, in part a reaction against the ruling passion of his late father, nor had any previous knowledge about wines.  However, with strong senses of taste and smell, and an uncanny ability to describe his experiences from those senses, Shizuku submerges himself in the world of wine and tries to solve the mysteries of the 13 wines and defeat Issei. In this, he is also helped by knowledge gained from his time as a child with his father, and supported by his friends, including trainee sommelier Miyabi Shinohara and colleagues in the newly formed wine department of his company, which he now joins.

Production

Development
All the wines that appear in the comic are authentic, with Yuko and Shin Kibayashi being passionate wine lovers and even owned a 3,000-bottle collection.  Neither of the authors have professional wine qualifications, but they grew up learning about French food and wine from their grandfather and drinks wine every day as a hobby. One day, the siblings tried a 1985 DRC Echézeaux and become more entranced in the deeper aspects of the wine world, stating "when [they] had it, it made us think about the culture, the people, and we started to see these complex pictures and patterns like a rug. It made us see these illusions."

Whenever the siblings drank wine, they played a game of describing the "image" of wine, much like how characters in manga tend to do, and realized they shared "similar imagery without much diversion of vision from each other". Wanting to share their visions with other people, Shin suggested creating a manga centered around wine. When deciding which wine to feature in the manga, they researched and consulted with wine experts, and every wine that appeared in manga the siblings tasted. Based on a certain standard, they tasted various kinds of wine at all price ranges and from different parts of the world, even ones that don't appear in the manga. They excluded wines they thought readers would be disappointed in, regardless of price, or wines they personally found "unattractive", though they made sure no negative thoughts about wines were shown in the manga.

For the sequel series, the siblings became more interested in food pairing after introduced the pairing of oysters and Chablis wine in The Drops of God. In the depiction of Marriage ~The Drops of God Final Arc~, they wanted to empathized how food and wine were intrinsic with each other, as there "are combinations that complement each other and that work against each other". To find an exquisite food pairing, they choose spent time in their kitchen and at restaurants trying out different ingredients from Japanese, Chinese, and Western cuisines in order to find out what pairs best with wine.

Theme
As frequently shown in the manga, the theme of the manga centered around the deep complexity of wine and the "story" behind it, and how wine "mirrors a country's food culture and lifestyle." According to the Kibayashis, they stated that wine is the "main character" of the story, instead of the protagonists Shizuku and Issei.

In series, the word “tenchijin"  is used, which refers to the "elements that create wine: heaven/vintage, earth/terroir and man." A Japanese winemaker, Koji Nakata, used this on the his wine label and was one of the inspirations for the sibling writers as they realized that "every amazing wine has these essences. It needs good terroir, vintage, and more than anything, a good winemaker...None of these essences can be absent to create a good wine. Even if one of them overpowers the other, it'll offset the balance. It's not simply an industrial product. When a person receives the gift from heaven and the earth, he can create wine. In the back of our mind, we always wanted to convey how amazing that is."

Characters

A young employee in Taiyo Beer beverages company, and the legitimate son of Yutaka Kanazki and his late wife (who died when Shizuku was six). His father gave him an elite education about wine when he was still a child, though he didn't realize it until reaching adulthood. However, he started rebelling against his father in his teens, resenting his father's obsession over it, and finally drove him to join a beer company. Incidentally, he was transferred to the wine department in the company and started to undertake the task of finding the "Drops of God". His sense of smell is extremely sensitive, so much so that he could discern the components of an unopened bottle of wine. He also inherited the superb intuition and verbal expressiveness about wine from his father. On the other hand, his knowledge about wine is amateur-level, but has been growing since he started working in the wine department and meeting various wine experts and lovers throughout his journey. He also travelled around the world with his father during childhood, giving gave a him broad experiences, being well-immersed in arts and culture of the world. The first wine he had ever tasted was Château Mont-Pérat.
Shizuku believes drinking is an essential part in understanding a wine, and comes to see wine drinking as a fun experience under any circumstance. He is simple-minded and optimistic, radiating a charming and warm personality that allows him to easily befriend anyone he meets and is helpful towards those in need. His concentration when pursuing goals and handsome appearance have attracted many women, but his insensitivity to romantic cues meant such feelings are normally unnoticed and unreciprocated. 

A sommelier apprentice working in a French restaurant, she is very knowledgeable in all matters related to wine and has shown some talents in wine tasting. However, due to bad luck and a possible lack of intuition, she has failed to pass the Sommelier qualification exam several times. She was subsequently contracted by Taiyo Beer to work as a consultant for its wine department.
She has been supporting Shizuku with her knowledge about wine, but Shizuku often mocks her to be too bookish about wine, though her skills improves as time passes. She almost always appears together with Shizuku, and harbors romantic feelings towards him, often expressing jealously over other women Shizuku spends time with. In the story, a running gag depicts Miyabi as having the habit of bringing a male friend to her apartment to drink wine, and almost always ending up drunk and waken up realizing she has undressed herself to her panties while drunk.

Shizuki's father and was one of the leading wine collectors in the world, with his entire collection said to be worth around 2 billion yen at the current market price. At age 67, he died of pancreatic cancer before the beginning of the story and left a will that initiated the "Drops of God" search, with the underlying purpose of providing guidance to his two heirs, Shizuku and Issei. Yutaka was a globally renowned wine critic on par with Robert Parker and his writings used to influence the market price of various wines. In his younger days, Yutaka made a fortune through wine futures trading and has forged numerous connections throughout his lifetime, many of which Shizuku would become acquainted with during his journey.
Although enigmatic and deeply dedicated to his passion for wine, Yukata was ultimately a loving father to Shizuku, though he dislikes how Yukata put him through many strict, unique training methods in his youth and resented how Yukata seems to put wine over him and his late mother. During Issei's childhood, Yukata kept his distance from his older son, only checking in on him a few times, but eventually regretted this decision, thus including him in his will and legally adopted him one week before his death.     

Young and charismatic, he is a renowned wine critic and became the adopted son of Yutaka shortly before his death, and set his eyes on Yutaka's huge wine collections. Shizuku and Issei are the two beneficiaries listed in Yutaka's will, subsequently he became the main rival of Shizuku in the search of "Drops of God". Issei is in fact the illegitimate son of Yutaka and Honoka, thus Shizuku's half-brother - a fact Issei is aware of and seek to surpass Yukata's legacy, though only a few people (not even Shizuku and Sarah) know this secret.  
He is often seen as arrogant and cold, but is in fact extremely hard-working to improve his tasting skills and understanding of wine, enduring great hardship and even risked his own life to further his understanding of Yutaka's descriptions of wine in the will. For example, in the searches of "Drops of God", he traveled in Taklamakan Desert alone, climbed Mont Blanc, participated in multiple Marathons, and attempted deep diving. Issei has dedicated his life to wine to an obsessive degree, and will never lie about any matter related with wine, which is reflected in the fair-mindedness he has shown in his contest with Shizuku.  

A young American man sent by his father, Charles Watkins, to join in the search of the "Twelve Apostles" wines, starting from the "Ninth Apostle" and onwards, as in accordance to Yukata's will. Raised by his wine expert father, he is a genius in wine tasting with experience and talent that rivals both Shizuku and Issei, such being was able to identify the first eight Apostles immediately after hearing the descriptions and even one-up them on a few occasions. However, at the end of the search of the "Ninth Apostle", Robert criticized him for simply "copying and presenting Yutaka's account" without truly understanding the nature of the wine. After this setback, Christopher decided to start a journey to his refined own understanding of wine, though he still observes the "Drops of God" competition for his father and unofficially participates in looking for the Apostles. 
Although a frivolous self-admitted Japanophilia with a womanizer streak, Chris is a very sharp-minded, hard-working, and kind person, helping people along his journey. Despite knowing her feelings for Shizuku, Chris also develops a sincere crush on Miyabi, though she firmly rejects his romantic overtures.

She is Yutaka's lawyer and was naturally present when Yutaka made his will, being entrusted with the management of Yutaka's wine collection and the execution of his will. Along with Robert, Kiryuu presides as an overseer for the "Drops of God" search and thus a neutral figure in the competition, though she worries over Shizuku. 

The owner and sommelier of the wine bar "Monopole", the mentor of Miyabi and a trusted counselor for Shizuku. While quick remind Shizuku and his friends of their ever-growing tabs, he is very generous and often takes out fine wines to treat friends (such as Opus One and Calon-Ségur) and provides samples to help Shizuku whenever he needs it. In his younger days, he studied wine in France and used to be a member of the student protest and communist movements. Over the course of the series, more of Fujieda's personal life is revealed, such as his family and is eventually married to his old flame, Akie.

The owner of a famous restaurant chain and Miyabi used to work in one of his restaurants. At the beginning of the story, he was a businessman focusing on maximizing profits, such as instructing his managers to reduce stocks of wine in the restaurants and buy from nearby liquor stores when customers place orders instead. His managers all saw him as a cold-blooded businessman, but Mishima reunited with his past lover and in turn became a warmer and more generous person. Mishima is a good friend to Shizuku and Miyabi, lending them a hand from time-to-time and serves as another confidant to them, and they also helps him in return. 

The president of Saionji Corporation / SAION Tradeing, which specializes in the import and sale of wine, granting her extensive connections in the fine wine business. She is the financial sponsor of Issei and his on-and-off casual lover, though she wishes to have Issei to herself, despite knowing his habit of having romantic flings with other women. Maki is an unscrupulous and spiteful woman that will do anything to achieve her own purpose, even once setting up a trap to disadvantage Shizuku in searching one of the Apostles, and driving Loulan away from Issei out of jealousy. 

Half-French half-Japanese, Robert was Yutaka's most trusted friend and rival, having known each other since their youth. An eccentric with a cranky temperament, he currently lives in a cardboard hut built in a park in Ginza called Chateau Robert, while in fact he is a billionaire and the park in which he lives is actually privately owned by himself. Robert is a renowned wine connoisseur and has the experiences and talents to accurately identify the Apostles after hearing Yutaka's accounts in the will, hence serves as the unbiased judge of the "Drops of God" contest. Although neutral, he will sometimes give out advice to both Shikzuku and Issei. While he tries to hid it, Robert's health has been weakening over the course of the series, but is determine see Yukata's will through.
Sarah
The half-French half-Japanese, half-sister of Issei (born to the same mother) and a successful model, currently contracting with Taiyo Beer as its commercial model. She first drank wine at the age of 5, became a regular wine drinker at the age of 12, and started to fall in love with wine at the age of 14. She has extensive knowledge about wine, though not to the same extent as her brother, and Miyabi once commented Sarah is "like Madam Leroy". Sarah likes talking to Shizuku and has a somewhat devious interest in him, but keeps the fact that she is the sister of Issei away from Shizuku and sometimes checks on Shizuku's progress in searching various Apostles and reports the information back to Issei.

The manager of the wine department of Taiyo Beer and is one of the founder of the wine department, having established it with his superior and fellow wine connoisseur. A reticent and gentle old man, he often appears invisible in the department, but his knowledge and love of wine is unparalleled in the department. He also trusts his subordinates a lot and acts like a father-figure towards them, which greatly aids Shizuku in his search for the Apostles wines. 

Shizuku's colleague in the wine department and a hardcore wine hobbyist. He was dumped by a French woman before and subsequently became a fierce supporter of Italian wine, having deep knowledge in that category. Of humble origins, both his parents died and he has devoted himself passionately to wine, with his small apartment is almost fully stuffed with wine storages. Despite clashing Shizuku at first, they become good friends and Honma looks after the younger members in a brotherly way and always eager to help Shizuku in his "Drops of God" competition. Tadashi modeled Chosuka after the real life Japanese wine critic Atsushi Honma.

The most junior employee in the wine department and most tech savvy out of all them. At first, he knew nothing about wine and wanted to be transferred to the PR department, but he was assigned to the wine department instead due to a mistake of the new employee training department. However, he was slowly brought into the world of wine, and started to appreciate the depth and delicacy of wine. He also started to develop romantic relationship with a female colleague in the company and enjoys trying wine together. Kido dreams of spreading cheap and delicious wine that is relatively unknown, including wines outside France and Italy, amid Japanese wine drinkers. As a running gag, Kido would often receive comical forms of abuse from Honma whenever he makes a cheeky remark.
Kyrgyz Loulan
A Xinjiang girl with a Japanese mother who lives in the Taklamakna desert, and she was named after the ancient Loulan Kingdom. During the search of the second Apostle, Issei met her and she aided him in his mission. She knew nothing about wine at first, but has a superb sense of smell that rivals Shizuku's, prompting Issei invited her to come back to Japan to help him in the search of Apostles. She entered a romantic, somewhat casual relationship with him, but a jealous Maki eventually drive her away. Loulan then went to France alone and was adopted by Charles Watkins after witnessing her talent with wine. Under his masterful tutelage, Loulan learned more about wine and established herself as a genius wine taster in Paris in a matter of months, becoming a more sophisticated and haughtier person in the process. Having seen his obsessive devotion to wine first hand, she determined to surpass Issei in order to save him. 
 and 
Twins brothers that are Miyabi's high school friends and they looks after their family liquor store together after their father retired. Junya graduated from the elite Hitotsubashi University and believes "the quality of the wine depends on from which winemaker's hand it is made". Unlike Junya, Kenya used to be a Bōsōzoku and dropped out of high school and believes "the quality of the wine depends on from which vineyard it is made". Their constant bickering initially caused them to split the store in two sections, but Shizuku and Miyabi helps them find a compromise and develops a good friendship with the former. 

Smart, humble, and handsome, Ryo is Miyabi's high school classmate and her first love. Due to his wealthy family background, he was transferred to an elite private school where many of his schoolmates came from similarly wealthy backgrounds. There, his old value system was challenged and he slowly transformed to a brand-conscious and snobbish man. However, with the help of Miyabi, Shizuku and their colleagues Ryo regained his former self and rekindles his old friendships, as well forming one with Shizuku. After Ryo's father planned to send him to China to start new business there, Ryo proposed to Moegi, his former classmate's sister, and asked her to go to China together, which she accepts.

Ryo's girlfriend and Miyabi's old high school friend. She is a timid girl with low self-confidence, often thinking Miyabi and Ryo being a more matching couple. When invited to a party by Ryo, one of the girls in the party who knew Ryo in a miai tried to humiliate the humble-looking Moegi, and tricked Moegi in participating in a blindfolded wine tasting contest. However, Moegi turned out to have a great intuition about wine, and her descriptions of the wine received compliments from Issei. After a few months of dating, Moegi accepted Ryo's proposal to China with her fiancé and help him start a new business there.

The mother of Issei and Sarah who is a leading wine taster in France, and her husband is the director of a major airline. She has placed herself as a neutral figure in the contest between Shizuku and Issei, though will give them advice to nudge them in the right direction. When Issei was still a child, Honoka once attempted to kill him in a snow mountain during a depressive episode, which she is deeply ashamed of.
Charles Watkins
The father of Christopher Watkins and is one of the most wealthiest men in American, having a hand in many businesses and is a renowned wine collector. He is a long-time friend and rival of Yukata, similar to Robert. However, Charles also has complex love-hate relationship with Yukata, and according to Chris,  wishes to take "revenge" against him by using Chris and his adoptive daughter, Loulan, to interfere in the "Drops of God" search.

The "Twelve Apostles" and "The Drops of God"
To win each round of the competition to identify the 13 mystery wines, Shizuku and Issei have to present a correct choice of wine and a justification of the choice which most closely matches Yutaka's description of the wine in his will. The judge is Yutaka's old friend Robert Doi.

 Green background means the competitor won the round and picked the correct wine.
 Both choices were judged to be incorrect, therefore a rematch was held.
 Although they selected the same wine, as Issei refused to describe his wine, he was judged to have lost this round of the competition.
Christopher also participated in this contest and found the correct wine. However, Issei's description of the wine was closest to Yutaka's understanding, and was judged as the victor by Robert

Media

Manga
Drops of God was serialized was in Kodansha's Morning magazine 2004 to 2014 in Japan. It is also published in Korea, Hong Kong and Taiwan. Since April 2008, volumes have also been published in France by Glénat. By December 2007, the series had registered sales of more than 500,000 copies. By May 2021, Drops of God had sold over half a million copies, more than 3.5 million. By August 2021, series has cumulativated over 15 million copies in circulation.

Vertical Inc. published the series in North America under the title The Drops of God. After publishing four volumes (covering the first eight Japanese volumes and the first two Apostles), the fifth volume jumped ahead to the story arc for the Seventh Apostle (volumes 22 and 23 of the Japanese edition), published under the name The Drops of God: New World. Vertical stated that this was done "by author request" and urged readers to "tell all your friends about the series so there will be second and third seasons to fill in the gap!"

Starting on October 14, 2019, Vol. 1-11 of the English translation were available digitally through ComiXology on Kindle, with plans to have all 44 volumes in English translation by Kodansha. These were available free for Amazon Prime members. In May 2020, Vol. 12-22 of the English translation were released and Vol. 23-33 in October 2020. They released the final volumes, Vol. 34-44, in May 2021.

Volume list

Marriage ~The Drops of God Final Arc~
's serialization began on May 28, 2015, a few months after the original manga ended its serialization, and was completed on October 15, 2020, collected into a total of 26 volumes.
 Currently, Marriage ~The Drops of God Final Arc~ is only released in Japan and has not been licensed for an English release.

Volume list

TV series

A live action television adaptation, also titled Kami no Shizuku, was broadcast by Nippon Television in January 2009. In 2008, a Korean adaption was in the works, with actor Bae Yong-joon (who the Kibayashi siblings modeled character Issei after) expressing interested in it, but ultimately fell through and was never greenlit.

On August 24, 2021, a multinational, multi-lingual TV series "Drops of God", co-production between Legendary Television, Dynamic Television, France Télévisions and Nippon Television-owned Hulu Japan and in partnership with Adline Entertainment. Legendary Television will handling worldwide sales for all territories apart from France and Japan. Hulu Japan will be premiering the series exclusively in Japan simultaneously with the world premiere, set some time in 2023. Apple TV+ has picked up streaming rights for the series.

It will consist of eight hour-long episodes and filming locations for the series includes France, Italy, and Japan. The screenplay has been written by Quoc Dang Tran, and being is directed by Oded Ruskin, and produced by Klaus Zimmermann. In this adaption, the main character Shizuku will be portrayed as a French woman instead of a Japanese man, named "Camille", and Shizuku's father, Yukata Kanzaki, is reimagined as Alexandre Léger, the "creator of the Léger Wine Guide and emblematic figure in oenology". French actress Fleur Geffrier and Japanese actor Tomohisa Yamashita are starring as Camille and Issei, respectively. In an interview, Tran revealed that he read all 44 volumes of series and the TV drama spent five years in development, with various experts and consultants to ensure the story was authentic.

Others
A social game based on Drops of God created by Mobage was released in on February 9, 2011, and is only available in Japan. In November 2007, a music album inspired by the series was released.

On January 22, 2009, a diary book detailing the Kibayahi siblings creative process about the manga and columns of their research was released. A photo book about Kazuya Kamenashi and the 2009 TV series on March 3, 2009.

Reception and impact
The series has received both local and global critical acclaimed, being praised for its story, art, and educational knowledge of wine. It has been featured in the New York Times Best Selling list of manga many times.

Drops of God was also featured in The New York Times''' Dining and Wine section, highlighting the wines shown in the manga and their impact of sales.

Success, popularity, and cultural impact of Drops of God was famously credited for its influence for increasing interest wines, especially the ones introduced the manga and most notably, propelling obscure winemakers to celebrity status, increasing domestic and international sales, and even fed into wine speculation with bottles that were usually priced around $20 reaching the thousands overnight. In 2018, online wine magazine Grape Collective that French wine producers, such as Château Calon-Segur, Château Palmer, Saint Estephe, and Château Le Puy, gained 130% rise in sales in Japan during the first year of the manga's publication. In 2013, the mention of Château Poupille in the series had increased sales by 20 to 30% in Japan and around 50% in Taiwan, China and Korea.

When French comic book publisher Glénat translated Drops of God, the French wine market experienced visible changes in their stocks, particularly for three producers in their international and abroad sales. One of the most memorable wines covered in the Drops of God is Château-Mont-Perat, with its normal price of €15 changing to €150 per bottle and rise annual production of 25,000 cases to 50,000. In L'Expansion, the manga is cited to be "an extraordinary [sales] lever, much more effective than the Parker points". In France, the French government acknowledged that contribution, and the writers were presented with two awards, Order of Agricultural Merit in 2011, and Ordre des Arts et des Lettres in 2018 for their influential impact in their economy and help in maintaining interest in wine in young people. In 2010, prestigious La Revue du vin de France awarded the Drops of God staff their "Special Award of the Year", making them the first Japanese people to receive the award. In July 2009, Drops of Gods was even featured the Gourmand World Cookbook Awards Hall of Fame.

The Japanese importer Enoteca has stated that the character Shizuku has begun to influence its stock ordering decisions. The sale of fine wines in South Korea has increased significantly as a result of the popularity of the comic, with the sale of wine rising from less than a third of the market to around 70 per cent of alcohol sales. In 2005, elite South Korean companies was even reported to had bought all the wines introduced in The Drops of God as a way to “educate” their employees.

Youth demand for wine in Taiwan is largely driven by Drops of God. After an issue with a mention of lesser known producer Château Mont-Pérat came out, a Taiwanese importer sold 50 cases of Mont-Pérat in two days. Sales of Umberto Cosmo's Colli di Conegliano Rosso also leaped 30% after being mentioned in the Manga series.Hughes, Felicity, The Japan Times (April 11, 2008). A manga drunk on French wine All Nippon Airways reported it had to recraft the in-flight wine lists to accommodate the increased interest.

After being featured in the finale of the Japanese television adaptation series of Kami no Shizuku in March 2010, the little-known Bordeaux wine 2003 Château le Puy became significantly popular in Japan. In September 2010, the proprietor of Château le Puy, Jean-Pierre Amoreau, made public his intention to cease international sales of their 2003 vintage in order to deter wealthy speculators, so that the wine remains within reach of everyone.

A 2007 Reuters feature asserted that "wine industry experts believe part of the manga's appeal is that it teaches readers enough about wine to understand the drink and impress their friends, but does so in an entertaining way". In the July 2009 Decanter publication of "The Power List" ranking of the wine industry's individuals of influence, Shin and Yuko Kibayashi placed at number 50, citing that the work was "arguably the most influential wine publication for the past 20 years". In 2012, the Kibayashi siblings were nominated Wine Intelligence Business Award for their contribution in the wine industry. In 2016, the Kibayashis was awarded with the Asian Wine Personality award by The Drinks Business and Vinexpo for their influence on the wide trade, acknowledging wide readership across Asia, including Japan, Korea, Hong Kong, Mainland China, Taiwan and Indonesia.

Wine Salon and WineGame App
In 2019, the Kinayashis siblings collaborated with President of Bijou USA and Vice President of Bijou Japan, Peter Chiang, whose family the Napa Valley estate Kanpai Wines, on two Drops of God-themed projects, the Wine Salon and WineGame App. From October 20–21, the Kibayashis assisted in preparing the wine menu for a two-day event, choosing 30 different wines from 9 different producers. The Kibayashis also spend the event singing books and interacting with fans. During a press released, Shink and Yuko stated that they approached the event the same way they did with the series:

Winemakers that also attended the event credited the Kibayashis for their influence and praised Drops of God for its storytelling and creativity, as "[recognizing] these virtues in the wines that it folds into its stories" and emphasizes "The magic of wine is that it is as much a story as it is a beverage: a marriage of place, process, and people. Drops of God celebrates this magic.”

Following the venture, online wine salon for US consumers and a Wines of God app (developed by Chef Jose Andres and Rob Wilder), a branded version of the WineGame app, both named after the manga, was launched. Drops of God''-themed Wine Salon and WineGame app features an interactive educational wine game, personal wine recommendations for individual members, special offers from restaurants and hotels, and notify members of wine-related events.

References

 Les Gouttes de Dieu publications Bedetheque 

Footnotes

External links
 

 

2004 manga
Books about wine
Drama anime and manga
Kodansha manga
Seinen manga
Shin Kibayashi
Vertical (publisher) titles
Manga adapted into television series